José Almandoz (16 January 1938 – 4 March 2013) was a Spanish rower. He competed in the men's eight event at the 1960 Summer Olympics.

References

1938 births
2013 deaths
Spanish male rowers
Olympic rowers of Spain
Rowers at the 1960 Summer Olympics
Sportspeople from San Sebastián
Rowers from the Basque Country (autonomous community)